Daniel Arroyave Cañas (born 19 June 2000 in Yarumal) is a Colombian professional road racing cyclist, who currently rides for UCI WorldTeam .

Major results
2018
 1st Overall Vuelta a Colombia Juniors
1st Stage 4
2020
 1st  Road race, National Under–23 Road Championships
 1st Stage 2 Clásica Rionegro

References

External links

2000 births
Living people
People from Yarumal
Sportspeople from Antioquia Department
21st-century Colombian people